Sarsgrove Wood is a  biological Site of Special Scientific Interest south of Chipping Norton in Oxfordshire.

This ancient wood has a diverse geology resulting in a variety of soil conditions. A stream with poorly drained valley walls runs through the wood. More freely-drained areas have ground flora including early-purple orchid, primrose, bluebell, early dog-violet, sweet violet and narrow-leaved everlasting pea.

The site is private land with no public access.

References

 
Sites of Special Scientific Interest in Oxfordshire